Tamar Abashidze may refer to:

 Tamar Abashidze (1681–1716), wife of Alexander IV of Imereti
 Tamar Abashidze (died 1772), wife of Alexander V of Imereti
 Tamar Abashidze (1892–1960), Georgian actress